Gaurav Singh (born 11 May 1999) is an Indian cricketer. He made his List A debut for Mizoram in the 2018–19 Vijay Hazare Trophy on 19 September 2018.

References

External links
 

1999 births
Living people
Indian cricketers
Mizoram cricketers
Place of birth missing (living people)